There are over 20,000 Grade II* listed buildings in England. This page is a list of these buildings in the district of Babergh in Suffolk.

List of buildings

|}

See also
 Grade I listed buildings in Babergh
 Grade II* listed buildings in Forest Heath
 Grade II* listed buildings in Ipswich
 Grade II* listed buildings in Mid Suffolk
 Grade II* listed buildings in St Edmundsbury (borough)
 Grade II* listed buildings in Suffolk Coastal
 Grade II* listed buildings in Waveney

Notes

External links

Lists of Grade II* listed buildings in Suffolk